Monomoy usually refers to Monomoy Island off of the coast of Cape Cod, Massachusetts. It may also refer to:

 Monomoy Island Gunnery Range
 Monomoy National Wildlife Refuge
 Monomoy Wilderness inside the MNWR
 Monomoy Point Light in Chatham, Massachusetts
 Monomoy Shoals off the coast
 Monomoy Regional High School, serving Harwich and Chatham, Massachusetts

Ships
 USS Monomoy (AG-40), a cargo ship of the US Navy commissioned in 1918 and eventual US Coast Guard Cutter
 USCGC Monomoy (WAG-275), the former USS Monomoy
 USCGC Monomoy (WPB 1326), a US Coast Guard Cutter commissioned in 1989